Wolfgang Amadeus Mozart's String Quartet No. 17 in B-flat major, K. 458, nicknamed "The Hunt", is the fourth of the Quartets dedicated to Haydn. It was completed in 1784. It is in four movements:

 Allegro vivace assai
 Menuetto and Trio. Moderato
 Adagio, in E-flat major
 Allegro assai

Neither Mozart nor Artaria (the publisher) called this piece "The Hunt." "For Mozart's contemporaries, the first movement of K.458 evidently evoked the 'chasse' topic, the main components of which were a 6/8 time signature (sometimes featuring a strong upbeat) and triadic melodies based largely around  tonic and dominant chords (doubtless stemming from the physical limitations of the actual hunting horns to notes of the harmonic series)." According to Irving, Mozart's first intention was to conclude with a polonaise and sketched 65 bars (p. 17).

Its popularity is reflected in its use in various films, such as The Adventures of Huck Finn, Mystery Date, The Royal Tenenbaums and Star Trek: Insurrection.

References

External links
 

Recording by the Borromeo String Quartet from the Isabella Stewart Gardner Museum in MP3 format

17
Compositions in B-flat major
1784 compositions